Tehillah Magazine is known as a faith-based, lifestyle publication that is aligned with Tehillah Music Group, which is the Gospel Music Label of Bishop Paul S. Morton, Gospel recording artist and Presiding Bishop of Full Gospel Baptist Church Fellowship.

History and profile
The magazine was founded by Jerry Q. Parries (Publisher and President of Tehillah Music Group); Lyn Senegal (Editor-in-Chief), Yvonne Nelson-Mitchell, Esquire (Advertising Director and co-host of TRIPLE THREAT Talk Radio Show) and Gregory Jackson, Esquire (Managing Editor and co-host of TRIPLE THREAT Talk Radio Show)  and is published by Tehillah Publishing Group, LLC. The publication started out as a small church newsletter in 2006 and has evolved into a national publication that has been published continuously since June 2009. The headquarters is in Atlanta, Georgia.

Tehillah Magazine is a bi-monthly magazine for the African American faith-based community. The publication is primarily distributed to small- to mega-churches in all denominations and church organizations, i.e., Full Gospel, C.O.G.I.C., Southern Baptist and A.M.E., across the continental U.S. and Bahamas. The publication served as the official magazine for the 2010 Stellar Awards and will serve in the same capacity for 2011 and 2012. Tehillah Magazine interviews and features on its cover, or in articles, influential figures such as Roland Martin, Bishop Paul S. Morton, Kirk Franklin, Donnie McClurkin, Don Jackson, Rob Hardy and John Henton. The magazine also covers political, financial, health and travel topics that appeal to readers on a bi-monthly basis.

References

External links
 Official website

2009 establishments in Georgia (U.S. state)
African-American magazines
Bimonthly magazines published in the United States
Christian magazines
Lifestyle magazines published in the United States
Magazines established in 2009
Magazines published in Atlanta
Religious magazines published in the United States